The 1900 Primera División was the 9th season of top-flight football in Argentina. The season began on May 20 and ended on September 8.

The title was won by the English High School A.C., after their members joined again to the team to request their affiliation to the Association. Quilmes Rovers also returned under its new name "Quilmes Atlético Club". Both teams replaced Lobos and Lanús Athletic.

The championship continued with the 4 team league format, with each team playing each other twice.

Final table

References

Argentine Primera División seasons
1900 in Argentine football
1900 in South American football